"Galileo" is a song written by Emily Saliers and recorded and performed by folk rock group the Indigo Girls. It was released in 1992 on their platinum-selling fourth studio album Rites of Passage. It reached #10 on the Billboard Modern Rock Tracks chart, the first song by the Indigo Girls to break the top ten on any chart.

The song is about reincarnation, partially through the lens of the story of Galileo Galilei, the 17th century physicist, mathematician, astronomer, and philosopher who played a major role in the scientific revolution. The song's chorus invokes both existential angst and Galileo's genius with "How long till my soul gets it right/Can any human being ever reach the highest light/I call on the resting soul of Galileo/King of night vision, king of insight", referencing both the clarity of physical vision made possible through his modernizations of the telescope and his support of Copernicanism, which stated that the Sun, rather than the Earth, was the center of the universe. The song has frequently closed concerts since its premiere in 1992.

Chart positions

References

External links
Music video for "Galileo"

1992 singles
Indigo Girls songs
Female vocal duets
1992 songs
Songs about scientists
Epic Records singles
Song recordings produced by Peter Collins (record producer)